Carlos Timoteo Griguol (4 September 1934 – 6 May 2021) was an Argentine football coach and player, who played as a midfielder.

Life
His playing career was spent with Atlanta and Rosario Central. As a coach, after winning the championship with Rosario Central in 1973. He had three spells and a successful career in the Rosario's club. In the 1980s he soared to the top ranks of Argentine football by guiding Ferro Carril Oeste to two championships, in 1982 and 1984, featuring players such as Adolfino Cañete, Héctor Cúper, Gerónimo Saccardi, Juan Domingo Rocchia, Julio Cesar Jiménez, Oscar Garré and Alberto Márcico.

During his Ferrocarril Oeste days, Griguol would videotape the basketball team, and basketball coach Leon Najnudel would return the favor.

His conservative style made Griguol a non-contender for the job of national coach. He did get a chance to coach River Plate in the mid-1980s, but despite winning the Copa Interamericana in 1987  he was swiftly dismissed when results were not forthcoming and the team's style did not please the fans.

In the 1990s, Griguol took Gimnasia y Esgrima de La Plata under his wing, propelling it to its best harvest ever: two second-place finishes. He would return to Gimnasia twice.

He has also worked in Spain as the manager of Real Betis.

His trademark was a most unusual token of encouragement: he would slap each player in the face before the team entered the pitch. TV cameras caught this ritual more than once.

Timoteo was known mostly by his middle name, or as el viejo ("the old man").

Death
Griguol was hospitalized in late April 2021, after contracting COVID-19, which derived in pulmonary complications. He also had Alzheimer's disease. He died at Sanatorio Los Arcos in Buenos Aires on 6 May 2021, at the age of 86.

References

External links

  
 Ferro Carril Oeste biography 
 Vende Humo biography 

1936 births
2021 deaths
Sportspeople from Córdoba Province, Argentina
Argentine footballers
Association football midfielders
Club Atlético Atlanta footballers
Rosario Central footballers
Argentine football managers
Ferro Carril Oeste managers
Club Atlético River Plate managers
Club de Gimnasia y Esgrima La Plata managers
Real Betis managers
Rosario Central managers
Tecos F.C. managers
Argentine expatriate football managers
Argentine expatriate sportspeople in Spain
Expatriate football managers in Spain
Deaths from the COVID-19 pandemic in Argentina